John Bradshaw may refer to:

Politicians
John Bradshaw (died 1588), MP for Radnorshire
John Bradshaw (died 1567), MP for Ludlow
John Ernest Bradshaw (1866–1917), politician in Saskatchewan, Canada
John Bradshaw (Australian politician) (born 1942), former member of the Western Australian Legislative Assembly

Others
John Bradshaw (judge) (1602–1659), English judge
John Bradshaw (writer) (b. 1658/9), English criminal and supposed political writer
John Bradshaw (author) (1933–2016), American educator and self-help writer
John Bradshaw (Adventist) presenter of It Is Written
John Layfield (born 1966), better known by the ring name John "Bradshaw" Layfield, American professional wrestler
John Bradshaw (cricketer) (1812–1880), English cricket player born in Leicestershire
John Christopher Bradshaw (1876–1950), New Zealand organist, conductor, choirmaster and university professor

See also
Augustine Bradshaw (1575–1618), British Catholic, born John Bradshaw
John Bradshaw Gass (1855–1939), British architect and artist